Vegard Valgermo Forren (born 16 February 1988) is a Norwegian professional footballer who plays as a centre-back for KÍ Klaksvík. He was capped over 30 times for the Norway national team.

Born in Kyrksæterøra, Forren was originally a youth player at local club KIL/Hemne, before starting his professional career with Molde in 2007. After making over 150 appearances for Molde, he joined Southampton in January 2013 for a fee in the region of £4 million, but ended up not playing a single game. He returned to Molde in July 2013 for an undisclosed fee. As of 1 December 2019, Forren has made 384 appearances for Molde, the second-highest number of appearances by any player for the club. Alongside Trond Strande and Mattias Moström, he is the only player to have appearances for Molde in 12 consecutive Eliteserien seasons.

Club career

Molde
Forren was first discovered by Molde FK when they met KIL/Hemne in the first round of the Norwegian Football Cup. KIL/Hemne surprisingly won the match 3–1, with Forren and two other young players impressing highly. They were afterwards invited to trial for Molde in a junior tournament. Shortly after Forren signed a five-year deal with Molde. On 26 August 2007, Forren made his Molde debut as a 59th-minute substitute in the club's 12–1 win against Mandalskameratene. He got seven league games in the 2007 season and helped the team promote to the 2008 Tippeligaen.
He took the Tippeligaen by storm and European clubs as A.C. Milan, Newcastle, Liverpool and Hoffenheim, have watched him playing for Molde. But Forren stated that he wanted to stay in Molde for a while, even though his dream was to eventually play in a bigger European league. He said that he was still young and had a long career in front of him. He was also linked with Lazio and F.C. Copenhagen.

After winning the Tippeligaen with Molde in 2011, Molde rejected two offers from Club Brugge in December 2011. Forren then won the Norwegian league with Molde in 2012 for the second time in a row and VG and Aftenposten, along with broadcaster TV2, named Forren as the top defender in the Tippeligaen.

Southampton
On 18 January 2013, Forren signed for Premier League side Southampton on a three-and a half-year deal for an undisclosed fee. His first game was for the club's under-21 side on 4 March against Liverpool, when he scored the opening goal for the Saints in the 30th minute with a volley. During his six months at the club, Forren did not make an appearance for the Southampton first team.

Return to Molde
Rumoured to make a return move back to Molde, Forren insisted he wanted to stay at Southampton to fight for his place. However, on 11 July 2013, he left Southampton to return to Molde for an undisclosed fee. Molde won the 2013 Norwegian Cup after rivals Rosenborg was defeated 4–2 in the final. Forren assisted Jo Inge Berget on Molde's 2–2 equalizing goal in the game. He left the club on 1 January 2017, when his contract expired.

Brighton & Hove Albion
Forren signed for Championship side Brighton & Hove Albion on 7 March 2017 until the end of the 2016–17 season. He did not make a single appearance at the club and was released at the end of the season.

Second return to Molde
Forren re-signed for Molde FK on 27 July 2017. On 12 December 2017, he signed a new two-year contract with Molde. On 25 March 2019, Forren extended his contract to the end of the 2021 season. On 28 May 2020, Molde announced that Forren would leave the club by mutual agreement on 31 May 2020, after Forren stole money gathered from players fines to cover gambling debts.

Restart at Brann
On 9 June 2020, Forren signed a one-year contract with SK Brann. On 13 August 2021, the club and player agreed to terminate the contract following an unsanctioned late-night party at the club's stadium two days previous, where 12 players and 7 women were in attendance. On 26 August 2021, he was formally charged with raping a woman at the party. He denied the charges and the case was dropped on account of insufficient evidence on 20 October 2021.

International career
Forren made his debut for Norway U21 in the match against Ukraine U21 on 26 March 2008. He played a total of 14 matches for the under-21 team, scoring three goals, and was later capped twice for the under-23 team.

Forren made his debut for Norway in the 2012 King's Cup match against Thailand on 18 January 2012. He also played against South Korea a few days later, but had to wait to October 2012 for his first competitive match when he started the match against Switzerland, and played five consecutive matches alongside Brede Hangeland in Norway's central defence, until he was left out of the Norwegian squad for the match against Albania in June 2013 due to lack of playing time in Southampton.

Career statistics

Club

International

Honours
Molde
 Tippeligaen/Eliteserien: 2011, 2012, 2014, 2019
 Norwegian Cup: 2013, 2014

Individual
 Tippeligaen Defender of the Year: 2012

References

External links

Player profile on official club website 
From working at REMA to playing for the national team 

1988 births
Living people
People from Hemne
Sportspeople from Trøndelag
Norwegian footballers
Association football defenders
Molde FK players
Southampton F.C. players
Brighton & Hove Albion F.C. players
SK Brann players
Norwegian First Division players
Eliteserien players
Norway under-21 international footballers
Norway international footballers
Norwegian expatriate footballers
Expatriate footballers in England
Norwegian expatriate sportspeople in England